Manbang are a series of state-owned digital media players issued by North Korea's Korean Central Broadcasting Committee, providing over-the-top content in the form of channels. Created in response to streaming platforms like Netflix and Roku in the west, and the popularity of Chinese-made Notel players in North Korea, the name comes from the Korean word 만방 (manbang) meaning "everywhere" or "every direction", conveying the on-demand nature of the service. Due to North Korea's isolationism, users connect to the service not by internet but via the state-controlled intranet using the IPTV protocol.

Content
In addition to on-demand video, Manbang is reported to offer viewers the ability to watch live streams  of at least 5 channels:

Users may also find political information regarding the Supreme Leader and Juche ideology, and read articles from the newspaper Rodong Sinmun and the Korean Central News Agency (KCNA).

Worker education services for North Korean enterprises are also available via the Manbang service.

Availability
According to Korean Central Television (KCTV), viewers can use the service not only in Pyongyang, but also in Sariwon and Sinuiju - a region in which KCTV states demand for the equipment is particularly high, with several hundred users in the region.

References

External links
 Updating the Manbang app, demonstration of the system GUI by Martyn Williams, North Korea Tech

Telecommunications-related introductions in 2016
Television in North Korea
Streaming television
Internet radio
Digital media players